Peter Hunter Hamilton, born: 1800 at Queenston Heights, Upper Canada. died: 1857 at Hamilton, Ontario. Buried in Hamilton Cemetery. Landowner and businessman + half brother of city founder George Hamilton.

He owned extensive lands in the area, including lot 15 concession 3, purchased from elder half-brother (and city founder) George Hamilton in 1823, which served as a drill ground for the local militia and in 1851 became the site of Central School. Also owned the site of St. Andrew's Presbyterian Church, now St. Paul's Presbyterian Church (Hamilton), of which he was an elder in 1835. St. Paul's is now a national historical heritage site.

Tribute

Hunter Street in city of Hamilton, Ontario named after him.

References

1800 births
1857 deaths
Businesspeople from Ontario
People from Niagara-on-the-Lake
Pre-Confederation Canadian businesspeople